S.O.S Emergência is a Brazilian television comedy show aired by Rede Globo, created by Daniel Adjafre & Marcius Melhem  and with the general direction of Mauro Mendonça Filho. Its debut occurred on April 4, 2010. The first season featured 13 episodes, ending on July 18, 2010. The second season premiered on August 2, 2010 and ended on December 19, 2010, with 26 episodes.

Story 
The show tells the story of the unusual routine of professionals in the hospital Isaac Rosenberg, bringing humor to the relationship between doctors and patients. The characters of the series work in the hospital and deal, in every episode, with different patients.

Cast 
 Marisa Orth as Dra. Michelle
 Bruno Garcia as Dr. Mike (Wando in Brazil)
 Maria Clara Gueiros as Dra. Veruska (only season 1)
 Fábio Lago as Nurse Anderson
 Fernanda de Freitas as Dra. Evilyn
 Hugo Polosso as Dr. Brenon
 Cláudio Mendes as Dr. Camargo

Guest star 
 Ellen Rocche as Lisa
 Ney Latorraca as Dr. J. Solano

Audience 
The show debuted with an average audience of 18 million viewers, a number considered good for the time the series had been scheduled (23:00 pm). Peak audience was 23 million viewers.

References 

Rede Globo original programming
Portuguese-language television shows